Marrow 1 is the third EP of the Illinois-based industrial band, I:Scintilla, and the first in their Marrow series. All songs are acoustic. "Ammunition" and "The Shake" are acoustic covers of I:Scintilla songs from previous albums. "Girl U Want" is a Devo cover, and "Spit It Out" is an IAMX cover.

The artwork was illustrated by singer Brittany Bindrim.

Track listing
 "Drag Along" - 02:49
 "Girl U Want" - 04:09
 "Ammunition" - 04:50
 "Spit It Out" - 03:16
 "The Shake" - 03:54

References 

Marrow 1
Marrow 1